Saw Htut was the chief consort of Sithu of Pinya from 1340 to 1344. Her husband is not mentioned in any of the royal chronicles. He only appears in a Pinya era inscription as "King" Myinsaing Sithu. Sithu, who according to the inscription succeeded Uzana I, may have been a regent for his nephew and son-in-law Kyawswa I of Pinya. Their elder daughter Saw Gyi was married to Kyawswa I.

References

Bibliography
 

Queens consort of Pinya
14th-century Burmese women